The División de Honor Femenina 2016–17, or Liga Loterías 2016-17 after sponsorship of Loterías y Apuestas del Estado, was the 60th season of women's handball top flight in Spain since its establishment. Mecalia Atlético Guardés won their first División de Honor title ever. The season began on 10 September, 2016 and the last matchday was played on 27 May, 2017. A total of 14 teams took part the league, 12 of which had already contested in the 2015–16 season, and two of which were promoted from the División de Plata 2015–16.

Atlético Guardés won the championship by a two-points margin over 2nd team in the standings, Bera Bera. Further, regarding to European competitions for 2017–18 season; Atlético Guardés qualified to EHF Champions League, Bera Bera. qualified to EHF Cup and Rocasa G.C. and Rincón Fertilidad Málaga to EHF Challenge Cup.

Promotion and relegation 
Teams promoted from 2015–16 División de Plata
BM Base Villaverde
Mavi Nuevas Tecnologías

Teams relegated to 2017–18 División de Plata
Helvetia Alcobendas
Esencia 27 ULE CLEBA León

Teams

Final standings

Top goalscorers

See also
Liga ASOBAL 2016–17

References

External links
Royal Spanish Handball Federation

División de Honor Femenina de Balonmano seasons
Division de Honor
2016–17 domestic handball leagues
2016 in women's handball
2017 in women's handball